Guthmannshausen is a village and a former municipality in the Sömmerda district of Thuringia, Germany. Since 1 January 2019, it is part of the municipality Buttstädt.

References

Sömmerda (district)
Grand Duchy of Saxe-Weimar-Eisenach
Former municipalities in Thuringia